Julie Westwood (born 21 October 1952) is an English voice actress and puppeteer, best known for portraying Bessie Busybody in the children's television show LazyTown, as well as a career of other voices.

She lives in Bolton, United Kingdom with her sons Tom, 29, and Nigel, 27. Other television shows she has worked on, include the BAFTA award-winning Channel 4/Jim Henson series The Hoobs, in which she plays the voice of Tula, Cartoon Critters as the voice of Fleur and Fully Booked, a BBC Sunday morning television show with Zoë Ball, and later Gail Porter, where she played Morag the Cow. Her sons also joined her on Wolf It. She has also been the voice for Sara, for the manga series Mirmo!

Characters

 Bebe in The Furchester Hotel
 Bessie Busybody, Pixel (Puppetry only) in LazyTown Tula in The Hoobs Fleur in Cartoon Critters Madge in It's a Big Big World Morag the Cow in Fully Booked Sara in Mirmo! Y in The Basil Brush Show Commander Rhyme-a-Lot in Rhyme Rocket James Jones in Fireman Sam Miss Chicken in Dear Mr. Barker Box in Allsorts/Gigglish Allsorts''
 Kitty Kettle in The Magic House (TV Series)(Series 2-3)

External links
 

1952 births
Living people
English voice actresses
Actors from Bolton
Actresses from Lancashire
British puppeteers
British voice actresses
Muppet performers